Pelican Waters is a suburb of Caloundra in the Sunshine Coast Region, Queensland, Australia.

Geography 
Pelican Waters is located within the Caloundra urban centre  by road southwest of Caloundra CBD.

Pelican Waters is bounded to the north and north-west loosely by unnamed creeks, to the south-west by Bells Creek (North Branch), and to the south by Bells Creek.

The northern and eastern parts of the suburb are predominantly canal estates.

The Pelican Waters land selling agency has the slogan "Pelican Waters a magic place to live".

History

In 1881 explorer William Landsborough acquired land in the area now Pelican Waters and Golden Beach, calling his property Loch Lamerough. He died at this property in 1886. In 1946,  of Landsborough's property was sold to cover unpaid rates. It was purchased by real estate agent Roy Henzell. In 1989 Henzell's agency commences the construction of a canal estate from the wetlands of the Bell Creek estuary to create Pelican Waters.

The suburb named and bounded on 8 December 1995. The name Pelican Waters was proposed by the land developer.

Caloundra City School opened on 27 January 2005.

Education 
Caloundra City Private School is a private primary and secondary (Prep-12) school for boys and girls at Pelican Waters Boulevard. In 2017, the school had an enrolment of 281 students with 24 teachers (21 full-time equivalent) and 9 non-teaching staff (8 full-time equivalent).

There are no government schools in the suburb. The nearest government primary school is Golden Beach State School at Golden Beach. The nearest government secondary school is Caloundra State High School in Caloundra.

Amenities 
The Sunshine Coast Regional Council operates a mobile library service which visits the Shopping Village.

References

External links 

 

Suburbs of the Sunshine Coast Region
Caloundra